Christoper James McMahon (born February 4, 1999) is an American professional baseball pitcher in the Colorado Rockies organization.

Amateur career
McMahon attended Rustin High School in West Chester, Pennsylvania, where he played baseball and basketball. In 2017, his senior year, he went 8–0 with a 0.77 ERA over  innings. He was selected by the Atlanta Braves in the 33rd round of the 2017 Major League Baseball draft, but did not sign and instead enrolled at the University of Miami where he played college baseball for the Miami Hurricanes.

As a freshman at Miami in 2018, McMahon appeared in six games (four starts) in which he went 1–1 with a 4.44 ERA over  innings. He missed time during the season after undergoing knee surgery. In 2019, his sophomore year, he made only 12 starts on the season due to an arm injury - over  innings, he pitched to a 3–2 record and a 3.72 ERA with 67 strikeouts. That summer, he played for the USA Baseball Collegiate National Team. As a junior in 2020, McMahon went 3–0 with a 1.05 ERA over four starts before the college baseball season was cut short due to the COVID-19 pandemic.

Professional career
McMahon was selected by the Colorado Rockies in the second round (46th overall) of the 2020 Major League Baseball draft. He signed for $1.6 million. He did not play a minor league game in 2020 due to the cancellation of the minor league season caused by the pandemic. 

McMahon was assigned to the Spokane Indians of the High-A West for the 2021 season, appearing in 22 games (making twenty starts) and going 10-3 with a 4.17 ERA and 119 strikeouts over  innings. He opened the 2022 season on the injured list with a lat strain. He pitched a total of  innings for the year between the Rookie-level Arizona Complex League Diamondbacks and Spokane, going 1-0 with a 5.34 ERA and 25 strikeouts.

References

External links

Miami Hurricanes bio

1999 births
Living people
Baseball players from Pennsylvania
Baseball pitchers
Miami Hurricanes baseball players
United States national baseball team players
Spokane Indians players